Woolpack Island is a narrow island 1.5 nautical miles (2.8 km) long, lying 4 nautical miles (7 km) northeast of Vieugue Island at the west side of Grandidier Channel, off the west coast of Graham Land. Discovered and named by the British Graham Land Expedition (BGLE), 1934–37, under Rymill.

See also 
 List of Antarctic and sub-Antarctic islands

Islands of the Biscoe Islands